"Think of You" is the second single from Usher's 1994 self-titled debut album. It was co-written by Usher alongside labelmate and close friend Donell Jones and Faith Evans, and samples jazz musician Ronnie Laws' song "Tidal Wave" from the album Pressure Sensitive.

The song fared better than its predecessor, "Can U Get Wit It", climbing to #7 on the Hot R&B/Hip-Hop Songs, #58 on the Billboard Hot 100 and #70 on the UK Singles Chart. The video (directed by Hype Williams) features a young Taral Hicks, that Usher is singing to.

Track listing
US Vinyl, 12"
Think Of You [So So Def Extended Mix] 5:10
Think Of You [Album Instrumental] 3:48
Think Of You [Album Mix] 3:48
Think Of You [Bad Boy Remix] 4:16)
Think Of You [Bad Boy Instrumental] 4:16
Think Of You [So So Def Acapella] 3:38

UK CD single
"Think of You" [Album Version]
"Think of You" [So So Def Remix]
"Think of You" [So So Def Extended Mix]
"Think of You" [Album Instrumental]
"Think of You" [Bad Boy Remix]

Charts

Weekly charts

Year-end charts

References

1995 singles
Craig Mack songs
Usher (musician) songs
1994 songs
Songs written by Usher (musician)
LaFace Records singles
Arista Records singles
Hip hop soul songs
Songs written by Donell Jones
Songs written by Faith Evans
song recordings produced by Sean Combs